The Hitter is a 1979 American blaxploitation action film directed by Christopher Leitch and written by Christopher Leitch and Ben Harris. The film stars Ron O'Neal, Sheila Frazier, Adolph Caesar, Bill Cobbs, Dorothi Fox and Alfie Brown. The film was released in February 1979, by Peppercorn-Wormser Film Enterprises.

Plot
An ex-professional boxer who killed a man in the ring (O'Neal) tries to make a new start when teaming up with a fast talking but ageing hoodlum (Caeser) and an ex-call girl (Frazier) but soon get more than they bargained for when crossing an adversary from their past.

Cast   
 Ron O'Neal as Otis
 Sheila Frazier as Lola
 Adolph Caesar as Nathan
 Bill Cobbs as "Louisiana Slim"
 Dorothi Fox as Mabel 
 Alfie Brown as Sadie
 Percy Thomas as Bootblack
 Dana Terrell as Charlotte
 Dee Porter as Gretchen
 Gidget Pascale as Lucille
 Carla Ness as Esther
 Roux Forrest as Roux
 Lisa Venables as Bridgette

References

External links
 
 

1979 films
Blaxploitation films
American action films
1979 action films
Films set in Baltimore
Films shot in Baltimore
1979 directorial debut films
1970s English-language films
Films directed by Christopher Leitch
1970s American films